Chi Scorpii, Latinized from χ Scorpii, is a single star in the zodiac constellation of Scorpius. It has an orange hue and can be faintly seen with the naked eye with an apparent visual magnitude of 5.22. Based upon parallax measurements, this star is around 409 light years from the Sun. The star is drifting closer with a radial velocity of −23.6 km/s.

This is an aging K-type giant star with a stellar classification of K3 III, which means it has exhausted the supply of hydrogen at its core. There is a 57% chance that this evolved star is on the horizontal branch and a 43% chance it is still on the red-giant branch. If it is on the former, the star is estimated to have 1.09 times the mass of the Sun, nearly 27 times the solar radius and shines with 191 times the Sun's luminosity. It is around 8 billion years old.

Planetary system
One superjovian planet orbiting Chi Scorpii was detected in 2020 on a mildly eccentric orbit utilizing a radial velocity method.

See also 

 3 Cancri

References

External links
 

K-type giants
Scorpius (constellation)
Scorpii, Chi
BD-11 4096
Scorpii, 17
145897
079540
6048
J16135090-1150160
Planetary systems with one confirmed planet